The 1971 Hardy Cup was the 1971 edition of the Canadian intermediate senior ice hockey championship.

Final
Best of 5
Bathurst 3 Rosetown 2
Bathurst 2 Rosetown 1
Bathurst 5 Rosetown 2

Bathurst Alpine Papermakers beat Rosetown Red Wings 3–0 on series.

Eastern Playdowns

Teams
Northern Ontario: Val D'Or Olympiques
Ottawa District: Embrun Panthers
Maritimes: Bathurst Alpine Papermakers
Newfoundland: Labrador City Carol Lakers

Playdowns

Western Playdowns

Teams
British Columbia: Prince George Mohawks
Alberta: Lloydminster Border Kings
Saskatchewan: Rosetown Red Wings
Manitoba: Warroad Lakers
Thunder Bay: Fort Frances Canadians

Playdowns

External links
Hockey Canada

Hardy Cup
Hardy